The 1979 Western Kentucky Hilltoppers football team represented Western Kentucky University as a member of the Ohio Valley Conference (OVC) during the 1979 NCAA Division I-AA football season. Led by 12th-year head coach Jimmy Feix, the Hilltoppers compiled an overall record of 5–5 with a mark of 3–3 on conference play, placing fourth in the OVC.

Schedule

References

Western Kentucky
Western Kentucky Hilltoppers football seasons
Western Kentucky Hilltoppers football